Christopher J. Thompson (born May 19, 1982 in New Orleans, Louisiana) is a former NFL and CFL cornerback. He is currently cornerbacks coach for the Nicholls Colonels.

Playing career

College career
Thompson played collegiately at Nicholls State University.

NFL career
Thompson began his professional playing career in the National Football League. He was selected by the Jacksonville Jaguars with the 18th pick of the fifth round of the 2004 NFL Draft and spent the 2004 NFL season with the Jaguars. He played for the Chicago Bears during the 2005 NFL season, where he appeared in twelve games and accumulated 10 tackles. Thompson played for the Cleveland Browns and Miami Dolphins during the 2006 season and was with the Buffalo Bills during training camp for the 2007 season.

NFL Europe career

Berlin Thunder
Thompson played for the Berlin Thunder during the 2007 NFL Europe season.

CFL career

Edmonton Eskimos (1st tenure)
After being cut by the Bills, prior to the start of the 2007 NFL season, Thompson signed with the Edmonton Eskimos of the Canadian Football League. He was on their negotiation list for 2 years prior to his signing. Thompson spent his first year in the CFL with the Eskimos. He totaled 12 defensive tackles and one interception in that season.

Hamilton Tiger-Cats
Thompson was traded from Edmonton 
to the Hamilton Tiger-Cats on February 13, 2008. In his second year in the CFL Thompson was named a CFL All-Star. He set career highs in tackles with 60 and interceptions with 9. The following year, which was the 2009 CFL season, Thompson accumulated 49 tackles and 1 interception.

Edmonton Eskimos (2nd tenure)
Chris Thompson returned to the Eskimos for the 2010 CFL season. He would remain on the team for the next season through the 2013 CFL season. During those 4 seasons Thompson averaged 46.7 tackles per season and totaled 19 interceptions. Following the 2013 CFL season Thompson was released by the Eskimos on March 14, 2014.

Montreal Alouettes
After not playing for the 2014 season, Thompson and the Montreal Alouettes agreed to a contract on February 20, 2015. On June 9, 2015 it was reported by Herb Zurkousky of the Montreal Gazette that Thompson was released by the Alouettes.

Coaching career

College coaching

Nicholls
In 2016, Thompson was hired as cornerbacks coach for the Nicholls Colonels football team.

References

External links
NFL bio
Edmonton Eskimos bio
Hamilton Tiger-Cats bio

1982 births
Living people
American football cornerbacks
American players of Canadian football
Berlin Thunder players
Buffalo Bills players
Canadian football defensive backs
Chicago Bears players
Cleveland Browns players
Edmonton Elks players
Hamilton Tiger-Cats players
Jacksonville Jaguars players
Miami Dolphins players
Nicholls Colonels football players
Nicholls Colonels football coaches
Players of American football from New Orleans
Players of Canadian football from New Orleans